Razzia (French and other languages, 'raid') may refer to:

Raids
 Ghazw, military expeditions as described in early Islamic literature
 Razzia (military), surprise attacks against an enemy settlement
 a slave raid conducted by Barbary pirates
 a Police raid
 a Nazi roundup in World War II
 Raid of the Ghetto of Rome, 1943

Arts and entertainment
 Raid (1947 film) (German: Razzia), a German crime film
 Razzia sur la chnouf, released in the US as Razzia, a 1955 French gangster film
 Razzia (2017 film), a Moroccan drama film
 Razzia Records, a Swedish record label 
 Razzia (artist) (Gérard Courbouleix–Dénériaz, born 1950), a French poster artist
 "Razzia" (song), a 1982 song by Rainhard Fendrich
 Razzia!, a mafia-themed release of the board game Ra

See also
Raid (military)